Don Brose is a retired American ice hockey coach.  Brose was the head coach at Minnesota State University, Mankato from 1969 to 2000.  He previously served as the head coach at Concordia College (Minnesota) from 1958 to 1962.  In 34 years as a head coach, Brose compiled a record of 540 wins, 363 losses, and 79 ties.  At the end of the 2009–2010 hockey season, Brose ranked 14th all-time among college men's ice hockey coaches.

Career
Brose began his coaching career at Concordia College in Moorhead, Minnesota. Brose's Concordia teams won only four games in four years.  He was an undergraduate student while coaching at Concordia, receiving a bachelor's degree in 1962, and also playing on the ice hockey, baseball and football clubs.  Brose also received a master's degree from the University of Maryland, College Park and then joined the staff of the Mankato State College athletic department.

When Mankato State established a men's ice hockey program in 1969, Brose was given the task of building the program from the ground up. After an uninspiring inaugural year, the Mankato Mavericks dominated the competition in 1970–71, going 15–2–1 as an Independent.  Over the next 20 years under Brose, Mankato State had only one losing season. When the first NCAA Division II Men's Ice Hockey Championship was held in 1978, the recently rechristened Mankato State University was a part of it, finishing in third place. The next year, the Mavericks were again invited to the tournament and finished in second place. During the 1979–80 season, the Mavericks recorded their first 30-win season and won the Division II National Championship.

Brose coached the Mavericks to the Division II tournament three more times and led the team into the NCHA conference.  Brose took a year off during the 1983–84 season and returned to the team the following year.  Upon his return, the Division II ranking collapsed due to a lack of sponsoring colleges, necessitating both Mankato State and their conference to drop down to Division III. The Mavericks continued to excel during this time, winning three regular season conference titles and making the Division III tournament five time (the final four three times) in eight seasons. When the Division II level was re-established for the 1992–93 season, Mankato State left the NCHA to play at the Division II level.  Beginning in the 1996–97 season, Mankato State jumped to Division I as an independent.

In Mankato State's first season in Division I, Brose led the team to a 17–14–3 mark. Due to Northern Michigan leaving the WCHA after the 1996–97 season, Mankato State was invited to participate in the conference tournament despite not being a full member. With the Mavericks set to officially join the conference for the 1999–00 season, Brose delayed his retirement so that he could remain with the program as it became acclimated to the new conference. In his final season with the program, Brose led the newly renamed Minnesota State to a fourth-place finish in the conference and helped them advance out of the first round for the first time, receiving the WCHA Coach of the Year honors, as much for the season as his body of work leading up to his final year. He was replaced the following year by former assistant Troy Jutting.

In 2004, Brose was awarded the John MacInnes Award by the American Collegiate Hockey Association. He was inducted into the Minnesota State Hall of Fame in 2006.

Head coaching record
The following tables list coaching details.

See also
List of college men's ice hockey coaches with 400 wins

References

External links

1940 births
American ice hockey coaches
Living people
Concordia Cobbers men's ice hockey coaches
Minnesota State Mavericks men's ice hockey coaches
Ice hockey coaches from Minnesota